Takracetus was a primitive cetacean that lived approximately . The type specimen (GSP-UM 3041) is a partial skull though the literature mentions a second more complete specimen.

Notes

References

 
 

Protocetidae
Prehistoric cetacean genera
Fossil taxa described in 1995
Extinct mammals of Asia